Loncopué Aeroclub Airport  is an airport serving the town of Loncopué in the Neuquén Province of Argentina.

There is a shallow ravine south alongside the runway.

See also

Transport in Argentina
List of airports in Argentina

References

External links
OpenStreetMap - Loncopué

Airports in Argentina